Light Up Gold is the second studio album by American indie rock band Parquet Courts, initially released on August 18, 2012 on the lead frontman Andrew Savage's label Dull Tools. It was later released on a larger label, What's Your Rupture?, on January 15, 2013.

Track listing

Personnel
Parquet Courts
Andrew Savage – vocals, guitar
Austin Brown – vocals, guitar
Sean Yeaton – vocals, bass guitar
Max Savage – drums, percussion

Recording personnel
Jonathan Schenke – recording, mixing, mastering

References

2012 albums
Parquet Courts albums
What's Your Rupture? albums